This is a list of Chinese football transfers for the 2010 season summer transfer window. Only moves from Super League and League One are listed. The transfer window opened from 30 June to 28 July.

Super League

Beijing Guoan

In:

Out:

Changchun Yatai

In:

Out:

Changsha Ginde

In:

Out:

Chongqing Lifan

In:

Out:

Dalian Shide

In:

Out:

Hangzhou Greentown

In:

Out:

Henan Jianye

In:

Out:

Jiangsu Sainty

In:

Out:

Liaoning Whowin

In:

Out:

Nanchang Hengyuan

In:

	

Out:

Qingdao Jonoon

In:

Out:

Shaanxi Baorong Chanba

In:

Out:

Shandong Luneng

In:

Out:

Shanghai Shenhua

In:

Out:

Shenzhen Ruby

In:

Out:

Tianjin Teda

In:

Out:

League One

Anhui Jiufang

In:

Out:

Beijing Baxy&Shengshi

In:

Out:

Beijing Technology

In:

Out:

Chengdu Blades

In:

Out:

Guangdong Sunray Cave

In:

Out:

Guangzhou GAC

In:

Out:

Hunan Billows

In:

Out:

Hubei Luyin

In:

Out:

Nanjing Yoyo

In:

Out:

Shanghai Zobon

In:

Out:

Shanghai East Asia

In:

Out:

Shenyang Dongjin

In:

Out:

Yanbian

In:

Out:

References

China
2010